The Canton of Dol-de-Bretagne is a canton of France, in the Ille-et-Vilaine département, located in the north of the department. At the French canton reorganisation which came into effect in March 2015, the canton was expanded from 8 to 31 communes.

It consists of the following communes: 
 
Baguer-Morvan
Baguer-Pican
La Boussac
Broualan
Châteauneuf-d'Ille-et-Vilaine
Cherrueix
Dol-de-Bretagne
Epiniac
La Fresnais
Hirel
Lillemer
Miniac-Morvan
Mont-Dol
Pleine-Fougères
Plerguer
Roz-Landrieux  
Roz-sur-Couesnon
Sains
Saint-Benoît-des-Ondes
Saint-Broladre
Saint-Georges-de-Gréhaigne
Saint-Guinoux
Saint-Marcan
Saint-Père-Marc-en-Poulet
Saint-Suliac
Sougeal
Trans-la-Forêt
Le Tronchet
Vieux-Viel
La Ville-ès-Nonais
Le Vivier-sur-Mer

References

Cantons of Ille-et-Vilaine